South Australia is a state in the southern central part of Australia.

South Australia may also refer to:
"South Australia" (song), Australian folk song
South Australia (baseball team), baseball teams in Australia
South Australia (yacht), former name of New Sweden, Australian 12 metre class yacht

See also
Southern Australia